Saint Jacob of Nisibis Church of New Julfa, (Armenian: ,), is an Armenian Apostolic church in New Julfa, Iran. It is located inside St. Mary Church and is considered the oldest surviving church in New Julfa.

History 

Saint Jacob Church was built in 1607. Later in 1613, a larger church, by the name of St. Mary Church, was built beside it. The church is currently used as a separate chapel inside St. Mary Church.  There are a few stone crosses inside the church, the oldest of which is dated 1607. It was renovated in 1890.

See also
Iranian Armenians
List of Armenian churches in Iran

References 

Architecture in Iran
Churches in Isfahan
Armenian Apostolic churches in Iran
Oriental Orthodox congregations established in the 17th century
Tourist attractions in Isfahan